Cookstown Youth Football Club is an intermediate-level football club from Cookstown, County Tyrone, in Northern Ireland, playing in the Intermediate Division of the Ballymena & Provincial League. The club was formed in 1991. It has a number of under-age teams and a senior team. The club plays in the Irish Cup.

References

External links
 nifootball.co.uk - (For fixtures, results and tables of all Northern Ireland amateur football leagues)

Association football clubs in Northern Ireland
Association football clubs in County Tyrone